Education Update is an American non-profit monthly newspaper, published in New York City. It focuses on issues related to education and has a circulation of approximately 100,000.

The publisher, retired education professor Pola Rosen, began the newspaper at age 54, delivering the paper door to door on the Upper East Side of Manhattan, New York City.

The publication was honored with the Manhattan Chamber of Commerce's Best New Business of the Year Award in 1997.

See also
 Education in New York City
 List of New York City newspapers and magazines
 Media in New York City

References

External links

1995 establishments in New York City
Education literature
Education in New York City
Manhattan
Newspapers published in New York City
Non-profit organizations based in New York City
Publications established in 1995
Upper East Side